Netzach ( Neṣaḥ, in pausa: נֵצַח Nēṣaḥ, lit. 'eminence, everlastingness, perpetuity') is the seventh of the ten Sefirot in the Jewish mystical system of Kabbalah. It is located beneath Chesed ('loving-kindness'), at the base of the "Pillar of Mercy" which also consists of Chochmah ('wisdom').  Netzach generally translates to 'eternity', and in the context of Kabbalah refers to 'perpetuity', 'victory', or 'endurance'.

Ancient Israelite explanation
Netzach communicates the idea of long-suffering, strength, endurance unto completion or patience. This term appears eight times in the Hebrew scriptures and derivatives of this child root  from the parent root  appear over forty times in the Hebrew text. See the following passages:
 1 Samuel 15:29  
Also the strength of Israel will not....

 Job 34:36 
I request [that] Job will be proven up to the limit; he will return above men of misfortune.

 Psalms 13:1 
Yahweh, will You forget me continually? Until when?

 Jeremiah 15:18a 
Why has my suffering been without end?

 Amos 1:11c 
and he nursed his grudge forever().

 
English translations are original translations by editor Charles Williams

Jewish Kabbalah

 
Within the Sefiroth, Netzach sits geometrically across from Hod.  This pairing makes up the third such group, the "tactical" sefirot, meaning that their purpose is not inherent in themselves, but rather as a means for something else.

These sefirot mark a turning point. Whereas the first two groups of sefirot deal with God's intrinsic will, and what it is that He desires to bestow upon man, these sefirot are focused on man: What is the most appropriate way for man to receive God's message? How can God's will be implemented most effectively?

Netzach refers to actions of God that are Chesed, "kindness," in essence, but are presented through a prelude of harshness. Hod refers specifically to those events where the "wicked prosper." It is retribution —Gevurah, "strength/restraint," in essence, but presented by a prelude of pleasantness.

Netzach is "endurance," the fortitude, and patience to follow through on your passions. It is paired with Hod as the righteous attributes related to group interactivity, with Netzach being leadership, the ability to rally others to a cause and motivate them to act; while Hod is community, the ability to do the footwork needed to follow through on ideas and make them happen. Netzach is identified with our right (left leg or foot) when the Tree of Life is portrayed on the human form, while Hod is on our left (right leg or foot). 

The angelic order of Netzach is the Elohim, the ruling Archangel of which is Haniel. Its Qliphothic counterpart is A'arab Zaraq.

In Christianity
Netzach is considered one of the Fruits of the Spirit in the Pauline Epistles (Romans 5:3, Galatians 5:22)

References

External links
 Lessons in Tanya
 Kabbalah 101: Netzach & Hod 

Sephirot
Hebrew words and phrases
Kabbalistic words and phrases